Sin Boon Ann (born 19 March 1958) is a Singaporean former politician. He was the Member of Parliament for Tampines GRC from 1997 to 2011, where he was replaced by then Minister of Education Heng Swee Keat.

Sin is currently the deputy managing director of the Corporate & Finance Department at Drew & Napier, and used to serve as a lecturer at the law faculty of the National University of Singapore between 1988–1992.

Education
Sin received his primary, secondary, and pre-university education at Anglo-Chinese School. He graduated with a Bachelor of Arts from the National University of Singapore in 1982, followed by a Bachelor of Laws from the same institution in 1986. Sin subsequently attained the Master of Laws at the University of London in 1988, through a university scholarship.

Career
Sin has been the deputy managing director of the Corporate & Finance Department at Drew & Napier LLC since 2009, where he is principally engaged in corporate finance and mergers and acquisitions. He was a Member of Parliament for Tampines GRC from 1996 to 2011. During his tenure in Parliament, Sin was a member of the Government Parliamentary Committee for Health and Defence and Foreign Affairs from 2009 to 2011. Prior to his career in politics and private practice, Sin taught Public Law at the Faculty of Law of National University of Singapore from 1987 to 1992.

Sin was a member of the Infocomm Development Authority of Singapore's Legal Panel on Convergence Issues Committee. In 1999, he was also a member of the government appointed Company Legislation and Regulatory Framework Committee to review Singapore's company law and regulatory framework, and make recommendations for achieving global standards and promoting a competitive economy.

Directorships

Present
Rex International Holding Limited
SE Hub Ltd
OSIM International
OUE Limited 
Tampines Central Community Foundation Limited 
Courage Marine Group Limited (Incorporated in Bermuda)
Transview Holdings Limited
The Farrer Park Company
CSE Global Limited
DrewCorp Services Pte Ltd 
Drew & Napier LLC

Past
HRnetGroup Limited
MFS Technology Ltd
HealthSTATS International Pte Ltd
Japan Land Ltd 
Freshfields Drew & Napier Pte Ltd
Overseas Union Enterprise Limited
Auric Pacific Group Limited
China Coke & Chemicals Pte Ltd
Singapore Totalisator Board (Statutory Board)

Personal life
Sin is married with three children. He is a Methodist.

References

External links
Parliament of Singapore CV of MPs

Anglo-Chinese School alumni
Members of the Parliament of Singapore
20th-century Singaporean lawyers
Singaporean people of Chinese descent
People's Action Party politicians
National University of Singapore alumni
Singaporean Christians
Living people
1958 births
21st-century Singaporean lawyers